Spinoxin (SPX; α-KTx6.13) is a 34-residue peptide neurotoxin isolated from the venom of the Malaysian black scorpion Heterometrus spinifer. It is part of the α-KTx6 subfamily and exerts its effects by inhibiting voltage-gated potassium channels, specifically Kv1.2 and Kv1.3.

Sources 
Spinoxin is isolated from the venom of the Malaysian black scorpion H. spinifer, from which the toxin gets its name. Researchers first characterized it in 2003.

Chemistry

Structure 
Spinoxin is a peptide neurotoxin consisting of 34 amino acid residues. It has a molecular weight of 3.7 kDa. All members of the α-KTx subfamily share a common cysteine-stabilized α/β motif (CSαβ). In spinoxin the N-terminal contains the α-helix whereas the C-terminal contains the β-region/sheet, which is involved in the binding to the potassium-channel, resulting in blocking of the channel. Four disulfide bridges connect these terminals stabilizing the small protein. The pattern of spinoxin disulfide bonding has been determined to be Cys3-Cys24, Cys9-Cys29, Cys13-Cys31, and Cys19-Cys34. A 3D model of spinoxin can be viewed on this website.

Family 
Spinoxin belongs to the class of small proteins with knottin folds resulting from the four disulfide bonds. The superfamily spinoxin is part of is known as "scorpion toxin-like", and its family as "short-chain scorpion toxins".

Homology 
Spinoxin has 82% sequence homology with maurotoxin (MTX; α-KTx6.2). Most short-chain scorpion toxins contain three disulfide bridges, whereas several toxins belonging to the α-KTx6 subfamily, including spinoxin and maurotoxin, possess a fourth disulfide bridge.

Target 
Similar to maurotoxin, spinoxin is a member of the extensively studied α-KTx family of neurotoxins acting on voltage-gated potassium channels. However, little is known about spinoxin in particular. 
Spinoxin targets voltage-gated potassium channels Kv1.2 and Kv1.3, possibly by blocking the selectivity filter with its Lys residues. It has no inhibitory effects on Kv1.1 channels.

Mode of Action 
It has been reported that the following three amino acid residues in particular are important for blocking of potassium channels: Lys23, Asn26, and Lys30. Furthermore, three out of the four disulfide bridges affect the intensity of the inhibition, specifically Cys3-Cys24, Cys9-Cys29, Cys13-Cys31. The Cys19-Cys34 bond does not seem to be required for Kv1.3 inhibition.

Toxicity 
Spinoxin can cause intense pain, visual disturbances and swelling of the affected area. However, it is not lethal to humans.

References

External links 
 Uniprot P84094
 Structure of spinoxin

Ion channel toxins
Scorpion toxins
Neurotoxins